Andrew Hunter Holt (born December 22, 1981) is an American politician who serves in the Tennessee House of Representatives, representing District 76, covering Weakley County and parts of Obion and Carroll Counties. Holt is a Republican and currently serves as the vice-chair of the Agriculture and Natural Resources Committee and as a member of the Local Government Committee and of the Agriculture and Natural Resources Subcommittee. He served his first term in Tennessee's 107th General Assembly (2011-2012) and was re-elected to the 108th through 110th General Assemblies.

As a West Tennessee conservative, Holt was considered a major contender for U.S. Congress in 2016 in the Tennessee 8th District.

Education 
Representative Holt earned an MBA from the University of Tennessee at Martin in 2007.  He earned his B.S. in 2004 from the University of Tennessee at Knoxville.

Legislation 
Representative Holt introduced fourteen bills in Tennessee's 108th General Assembly. The bills impacted laws ranging from taxes, county road supervisors, criminal procedure, and agricultural operations. Representative Holt is a staunch conservative, and has a record for voting against almost every Democratic or "liberal" item on the agenda. He is often criticized for attacking government programs such as the Affordable Care Act without proposing alternative solutions.

On January 5, 2016, Andy Holt was heavily criticized for making statements towards President Obama regarding the president's executive orders on gun control. He took to Twitter to tell the president to “Take your gun control and shove it”. This came on the heels of Holt's highly publicized Twitter spat stemming from a tweet he made in support of the armed occupation of the Mulheur National Wildlife Refuge led by Ammon Bundy for which he received criticism including a call by Chattanooga City Councilman, Chris Anderson, for a Department of Justice investigation into Holt's “treasonous” behavior.

Holt supported a 2018 bill to strip Memphis of $250,000 after the majority-black city opted to remove the busts of Confederate President Jefferson Davis and Confederate General and Ku Klux Klan leader Nathan Bedford Forrest.

On June 9, 2020, Holt voted as a member of the House Naming, Designating, & Private Acts Committee against removal of a bust honoring Ku Klux Klan Grand Wizard Nathan Bedford Forrest from the Tennessee State Capitol building.

Agricultural Issues 
Of the two bills impacting agricultural operations that were introduced by Holt, one gained national attention. Holt's HB 1191 (and companion SB 1248 introduced by Senator Dolores R. Gresham (R-26)) required anyone intentionally recording images documenting cruelty against livestock to, within 48 hours, report the violation and submit unedited photographs or video recordings to law enforcement. The bill made violation of the law a class C misdemeanor punishable by fine.

This type of bill, sometimes characterized as “anti-whistleblower” or “ag-gag” legislation, sparked heated public discourse. Rep. Holt asserted that the bill was intended to quickly expose animal cruelty. However, animal protection organizations, such as the ASPCA, the Humane Society of the United States, and Mercy for Animals opposed the bill, arguing that it would instead result in short, incomplete investigations and prevent whistleblowers from coming forward, for fear of prosecution.

In public debate over HB 1191 after it passed and before it was signed into law by the governor, Rep. Holt sent an email to HSUS Public Policy Coordinator Kayci McLeod saying that "propagandist groups of radical animal activists, like your fraudulent and reprehensibly disgusting organization of maligned animal abuse profiteering corporatists ... are intent on using animals the same way human-traffickers use 17 year old women," and referring to HSUS methods as "tape and rape".

Rep. Holt also debated the issue, via Twitter, with country singer Carrie Underwood. Underwood criticized Tennessee lawmakers saying “Shame on TN lawmakers for passing the Ag Gag bill. If Gov. Bill Haslam signs this, he needs to expect me at his front door. Who’s with me?” Holt replied, “I would say that if Carrie Underwood will stick to singing, I’ll stick to lawmaking.”   Underwood, in turn replied “I should stick to singing? Wow…sorry, I’m just a tax paying citizen concerned for the safety of my family.”

On May 13, 2013, Tennessee Governor Bill Haslam indicated that he would veto the bill because the Attorney General called the law "constitutionally suspect", because it appears to repeal parts of Tennessee's Shield Law without saying so, and because "there are concerns from some district attorneys that the act actually makes it more difficult to prosecute animal cruelty cases".

Personal 
Andy Holt is married to Ellie Anderson Holt, with whom he has seven children. The Holts own and operate a farm near Dresden, Tennessee.

Holt also works for Bethel University and is a member of the Weakley County Farm Bureau Board of Directors.

Representative Holt is a member and deacon at Long Heights Baptist Church in McKenzie, Tennessee.

References 

1981 births
Living people
People from Dresden, Tennessee
University of Tennessee alumni
University of Tennessee at Martin alumni
Businesspeople from Tennessee
Members of the Tennessee House of Representatives
21st-century American politicians